Carlos Desiderio Peucelle (13 September 1908 – 1 April 1990) was an Argentine football player who played as an inside forward or as a right winger and is considered one of Argentina's finest wingers in their history. He is also known for being the catalyst for starting "La Máquina" with River Plate who went on to dominate football in South America in the 1940s.

Playing career
Peucelle played first team football for San Telmo and Sportivo Buenos Aires before joining Argentine giants River Plate for a fee of 10,000 pesos.

Peucelle played for River from 1931 to 1941 (307 matches and scored 143 goals). During this time "Los Millonarios" were champions of Argentina on 4 occasions; 1932, 1936, 1937 and 1941.

Peucelle also played for the Argentina national football team he was in the squad of the 1930 FIFA World Cup, where he scored three goals, and played in the final match against Uruguay, which Argentina lost 2–4.

Peucelle was part of two Copa América winning squads, in 1929 and 1937.

Peucelle played a total of 59 games for Argentina scoring 12 goals.

Coaching career
After he retired, he was chief managers of several teams throughout Latin America. These included; Deportivo Cali in Colombia, Deportivo Saprissa in Costa Rica, Sporting Cristal in Peru and Olimpia in Paraguay. Peucelle also managed River Plate and San Lorenzo in Argentina.

Facts
 Peucelle established the first soccer school in Colombia.
 Peucele is credited as being one of the creators of "La Máquina" (The Machine), the all conquering River Plate team of the 1940s. In fact he wrote a book entitled "Futbol Todotiempo e Historia de La Máquina" (Football the times and history of "La Máquina")
 Peucelle gained the nickname "El Primer Millonario" because of his big money transfer from Sportivo Buenos Aires.

Career statistics

International goals
Argentina's goal tally first

Honours

Club
River Plate
 Primera División (4): 1932, 1936, 1937, 1941
 Copa Competencia (LAF) (1): 1932
 Copa Ibarguren (2): 1937, 1941
 Copa Adrián C. Escobar (1): 1941
 Copa Aldao (3): 1936, 1937, 1941

International
Argentina
 Copa América (2): 1929, 1937

References

External links

 

1908 births
1990 deaths
Footballers from Buenos Aires
Argentine footballers
1930 FIFA World Cup players
Association football forwards
Argentina international footballers
Club Atlético River Plate footballers
Argentine Primera División players
Argentine football managers
Argentine people of French descent
Club Atlético River Plate managers
San Lorenzo de Almagro managers
Deportivo Cali managers
Sporting Cristal managers
Deportivo Saprissa managers
Club Olimpia managers
Place of birth missing
Expatriate football managers in Colombia
Expatriate football managers in Costa Rica
Expatriate football managers in Paraguay
Expatriate football managers in Peru
Copa América-winning players
Argentine expatriate sportspeople in Peru